Active Space Technologies is a Portuguese company, with main offices in Portugal, headquartered in Coimbra, which offers products and services in the fields of thermo-mechanical engineering (thermal and structural analysis, design, manufacturing, and testing), electronics engineering (embedded systems, digital control), as well as management support services for technology transfer and development projects (project management, systems engineering, project coordination). The company operates in the global markets of aerospace, defence, automotive, nuclear fusion, and scientific sectors. Its offices are in Coimbra and Lisbon (Portugal), Southampton (United Kingdom) and Noordwijk (The Netherlands).

Milestones
 In August 2015, Active Space Technologies made equipment for NASA.
 In October 2008, Bruno Carvalho, CEO of Active Space Technologies, was awarded the 2nd edition of Young Professionals Entrepreneurship Prize while he attended the International Astronautical Congress (IAC) in Glasgow.
 In July 2008, Active Space Technologies become a member of AFIA, the Portuguese Association of Automotive Suppliers.
 In November 2007, Active Space Technologies opened, through a joint venture with local entrepreneurs, its German associate company (Active Space Technologies GmbH).
 In June 2007, Active Space Technologies was given the “Young Entrepreneur of the Year” award by the Portuguese National Association of Young Entrepreneurs (ANJE).
 In March 2007, Active Space Technologies agreed to provide 6 engineer-months of structural engineering support to the Mars Gravity Biosatellite, a project jointly run by MIT and Georgia Tech.
 In November 2006, Active Space Technologies was granted a contract to provide expertise to nuclear fusion project ITER.
 In May 2006, following its expansion strategy, Active Space Technologies moved into a new office in the Instituto Pedro Nunes (IPN), University of Coimbra's business incubator and technology transfer centre.

References

External links
 Official website

Portuguese brands
Portuguese companies established in 2004
Engineering companies of Portugal
Technology companies established in 2004
Organisations based in Coimbra